Philip James Hilts (1947 – April 23, 2022) was an American journalist and author. He worked for The New York Times and The Washington Post.

Hilts was born on May 10, 1947, in Chicago, Illinois. Edward, his father, was a writer. Katherine (Bonn) Hilts, his mother, worked at Sears.

He died on April 23, 2022, in Lebanon, New Hampshire, due to liver disease complications.

Books
Smokescreen: The Truth Behind the Tobacco Industry Cover-Up (Addison-Wesley, 1996)
Rx for Survival: Why We Must Rise to the Global Health Challenge (2005)
Protecting America’s Health: The FDA, Business, and One Hundred Years of Regulation (2003)
Scientific Temperaments: Three Lives in Contemporary Science (1982)

References

1947 births
2022 deaths 
Deaths from liver disease
Journalists from Illinois
Writers from Chicago